Thank You Mr. Churchill is the fourteenth studio album from Peter Frampton, released through New Door Records in North America and through Eagle Rock in Europe.

Reception
Since its release, the album has been met with mostly positive reviews from critics. William Clark of Guitar International wrote, "Without any exaggeration I can easily say that this mostly ignored album from 2010 contains some of the best music Peter Frampton has ever pushed out to date".

Track listing
All tracks composed by Peter Frampton; except where indicated
 "Thank You Mr. Churchill" (Frampton, John Regan) - 4:55
 "Solution" (Frampton, Gordon Kennedy) - 3:49
 "Road to the Sun" (Featuring Smoking Gun with Julian Frampton) (Frampton, Julian Frampton) - 5:10
 "I'm Due a You" (Frampton, Kennedy) - 5:00
 "Vaudeville Nanna and the Banjolele" (Frampton, Kennedy) - 4:35
 "Asleep at the Wheel" - 6:50
"Suite: Liberte. A. Megumi B. Huria Wat" - 7:28
 "Restraint" (Frampton, Kennedy) - 3:42
 "I Want it Back" - 4:38
 "Invisible Man" (Frampton, Kennedy) - 4:51
 "Black Ice" - 4:49

Non North America edition
 "I Understand" - 3:30 [Bonus Track]
 "A Thousand Dreams" - 5:17 [Bonus Track]

Personnel
Peter Frampton - vocals, electric and acoustic guitar, bass, dulcimer, E-bow, Wurlitzer, ukulele
Eddie Willis, Gordon Kennedy - electric guitar
Bob Babbitt, Craig Young - bass
Rob Jones - grand piano, synthesizer
Chad Cromwell, Kenneth "Spider" Rice, Matt Cameron - drums
Eric Darken, Matt Cameron - percussion
Kira Small, Marcia Ware, Scat Springs - background vocals
Julian Frampton - vocals on "Road to the Sun"
Benmont Tench - Hammond organ on "Thank You Mr. Churchill"
Don Gunn - engineer

References

2010 albums
Peter Frampton albums
Albums produced by Chris Kimsey
Albums produced by Peter Frampton